Eccles is a village in the English county of Kent, part of the parish of Aylesford and in the valley of the River Medway.

Archaeology
It is near to the site of a Roman villa estate and pottery kiln, excavated between 1962 and 1976. The site was occupied from a decade or so after the Roman invasion up until the end of Roman Rule.  The villa underwent at least four main phases of construction.  There is possible evidence of a military influence in the initial period and latterly it comprised 37 rooms or more. It was preceded by an earlier development represented by a small, rectangular granary and an associated length of boundary wall, dating to AD 55-AD 65. The discovery of large-scale pottery manufacture in the immediate post-conquest era suggests the likelihood of industrial installations such as workshops, stores and wharves along the Medway.  The villa has been described as a particularly large and grand example of its kind and one of the most important villas in Britain from several points of view.  Situated beneath and around the villa are traces of an earlier, Iron Age farmstead, represented by a group of linear boundary ditches and pits.  

A large Saxon cemetery was discovered adjacent to the south-east wing of the villa formed by 200 or more graves aligned east–west and containing extended human skeletons.  Up to three layers of burials were recognised during excavation. Grave goods were found with some of the lower and outlying burials, giving them a likely mid-seventh century date.  Some of the skeletons showed evidence of having suffered fatal weapon injuries probably originating from a single hostile event. Towards the south east of the cemetery are a group of post holes which have been interpreted as a shrine, temple or small chapel. Signs of reuse during the medieval period include cesspits and rough cobbling beyond the  courtyard boundary wall.

The archaeological site incorporates evidence of Roman and Medieval tile kilns, dating from AD 180 to AD 290 and from the mid thirteenth century respectively. Additionally, large quantities of waste material indicate the site of a Roman pottery kiln with a terminal date of AD 70.

Further details of the archaeology in this area can be found in The Romano-British Villa and Anglo-Saxon Cemetery at Eccles, Kent.

There is a reference to the Common Park at Aylesford, dating to 1597, which has been interpreted as a deer park, although it could refer to a common. The site lies to the South of Eccles village and to the west of (now) Bull Lane. According to an 1805 map the park consisted of some 269 acres

Origins of the village
Prior to 1850, the area now occupied by Eccles was mostly farms and arable land.  Around that time, the builder Thomas Cubitt bought two farms near the river and opened a brickyard and cement works. The brick works was the most advanced in the world producing up to 30 million bricks a year. Situated on a gentle slope, the buildings were positioned along tram lines so that each stage of manufacture moved closer to the quay; with this arrangement production progressed by gravity rather haulage.  Transfers within the works site were facilitated by upwards of three miles of tram and railroad, connecting the works buildings with the extraction pits and the wharf. Piped
water was provided to the works from a large reservoir. At its peak, the works employed almost a thousand men and boys. The plant formally closed in 1941 and was later demolished.

As the brick works was established, a local farmer Thomas Abbot built a terrace of 22 cottages to house the workers, the settlement soon increased to 300.  The area was known as ‘Bull Lane’ before it adopted the name of ‘Eccles’. The former name still appears on the Ordnance Survey map of 1897.

Although the village did not acquire the name ‘Eccles’ until some time in the second half of the 19th century, the name is not new. In her book The Place Names of Kent, Judith Glover traces it in its present form back to 1208 and suggests that it derived from the 10th-century 'Aecclesse', meaning the 'meadow of the oak'. The Domesday Book of 1086 records Eccles as ‘Aiglessa’.   At that time, it had a population of 22 households, putting it in the largest 40% of recorded settlements. It has also been suggested that the name 'Eccles' comes from the Latin word 'ecclesia' meaning 'church', implying that a post-Roman Christian community existed in the area, although there is no evidence for this.  Volume 4 of The History and Topographical Survey of the County of Kent, published in 1798, reports that Eccles was a manor of the parish of Aylesford, "which was of some note in the time of the Conqueror, being then part of the possessions of Odo, bishop of Baieux, the king's half brother, under the general title of whose lands it is thus entered in the book of Domesday". The site of the manor of Eccles was lost to public knowledge by the 18th Century, but it was surmised to be somewhere at the eastern extremity of the parish, near Boxley Hill.

A detailed history of the village of Eccles can be found in The Medway Valley: A Kent landscape transformed.

Current amenities
There is a school, a church, a pub, a convenience store with post office services, and a doctors’ surgery. There is also a church hall, which is used by the village pre-school, and a drop-in centre for the over-50s in Cork Street.

At the centre of the village is a large park (‘the Rec’) with a skate park, children's play facilities and exercise equipment for adults. On weekends there are junior football games. Nearby, there is a sports field which has been used by Eccles Football Club since the 19th century.

There is now just one pub in Eccles, the Red Bull, which is grade II listed. The Walnut Tree was demolished in early 2012 and the site developed into private housing.

St Mark’s School, Eccles, is a small mixed-year group, Church of England Primary School. It was rebuilt in 2002 on a green-field site close to the small Victorian building that it replaced. It is set in attractive grounds, with solar roof panels, large gardens, allotment beds and a sports court.

A library bus visits every Tuesday afternoon.

A farmers’ market is held on every third Sunday of the month at Aylesford Priory which is within walking distance of the village.

Location and surroundings
Eccles is three miles from junctions 5 and 6 of the M20 motorway, and the same distance from junction 3 of the M2 motorway. Maidstone East Station is  miles away. The village also has road access to communities on the west bank of the Medway by way of Peter's Bridge which was opened in September 2016.

Eccles sits between the villages of Aylesford (one mile away) and Burham (also one mile away), below the North Downs whose shelter provides a favourable micro-climate for both the village and the adjacent vineyards.

There is a network of footpaths around the village providing access to the surrounding countryside, vineyards and the River Medway. There are all-weather footways south to Aylesford Priory and north to Pilgrims' Way and thence to Burham. Beyond Burham, there is a combined footpath and cycle way down to the Riverside Walk at Peter's Village.

Eccles features on a number of ramblers' routes. For example, it is part of the 'Ancient Sites of Aylesford' walk, which incorporates the ancient monuments of Kit's Coty House and Little Kit's Coty House.

Three major long-distance trails pass within a mile of the village. They are the Pilgrims' Way, the North Downs Way and the Medway Valley Walk.

Kit’s Coty vineyard
The vineyard adjacent to Eccles village is located on land acquired by the wine producer Chapel Down in 2007.   It is named after the ancient monument which is situated on the slope of the North Downs immediately above. The conditions for viniculture are reputed to be similar to those of the Champagne region in France.  By coincidence, the route of the 2007 Tour de France through Kent included a section of Pilgrim’s Way that lies immediately along the northern boundary of the vineyard.

At one time, prior to its acquisition by Chapel Down, the land had been designated as the site for the Mid Kent Parkway Station on the Channel Tunnel Rail Link.  However, following strong opposition from PEFTT (Protect Eccles From The Train) and other local groups, it was eventually decided that the rail route would not run along the Medway Valley past Eccles and Burham but would instead pass through a 4 km tunnel under Blue Bell Hill, and run alongside the M2. Among those claiming credit for this decision were a coven of White Witches from Hastings who had previously performed a ritual at Little Kit’s Coty House on the Countless Stones to protect them from any disturbance by the railway.

The 95 acres of the vineyard are planted with Chardonnay, Pinot Noir and Bacchus grapes.  The Chardonnay grape is used in a premium single-vineyard range of wines which are marketed as the Kit’s Coty Collection.

Notable people
Sharon Bennett, English Illustrator, designer, artist and author

Sources
Detsicas, A, The Cantiaci, Sutton, Gloucester, 1987

References

External links

 A leaflet which describes the Eccles locality.
 A series of leaflets which give an overview of the Medway Gap.
 A circular walk from Aylesford Station which passes through Eccles
  Entry under the National Heritage List for England for 'Romano-British villa, Anglo-Saxon cemetery and associated remains at Eccles'.   List Entry Number: 1011770
  Victorian Ordnance Survey Map (1888-1913) of Burham Brick Works and Eccles.
  ‘Cementopolis’, Andrew Ashbee, p47-50. A detailed account and engravings of the Burham brickworks, reproduced from The Illustrated News of the World 1859.
 Episode 12 of Series 20 of ‘Homes Under the Hammer’ gives a brief overview of Eccles at 31:30 and 50:00.

Villages in Kent
Tonbridge and Malling